"Stillness in Time" is a song by British funk and acid jazz band Jamiroquai, released in 1994 on their second studio album, The Return of the Space Cowboy (1994), and the year after as a single. The track peaked at number nine on the UK Singles Chart, making it the group's highest-charting release to that date. The track also reached number one on the UK Dance Chart.

Background
Three main versions of the track exist: a radio edit, which runs at 3:43; the main album version, which runs at 4:11; and the extended vinyl version, which runs at 6:13 and appears on the vinyl version of The Return of the Space Cowboy.

The song was later covered by Scottish DJ Calvin Harris for Radio 1's 40th-anniversary album, Radio 1 Established 1967, which was released in 2007. This version features snippets of the Jamiroquai original; however, Jamiroquai is not credited on the release.

Critical reception
Pan-European magazine Music & Media wrote, "By going retro the clock automatically stands still at '70s soul. From wine bars to chic night clubs to the more sophisticated stations, the song will be used to create ambience." A reviewer from Music Week rated it three out of five, adding, "A slightly more down tempo funky Latin tune from The Return of the Space Cowboy with Morales mixes of the album's title track on the flip. A summery jaunt."

Track listing

 UK CD: 1 
 "Stillness in Time" (radio edit) – 3:40
 "Space Cowboy" (classic radio edit) – 4:01
 "Space Cowboy" (classic club mix) – 7:52
 "Stillness in Time" (vinyl version) – 6:13

 UK CD: 2
 "Stillness in Time" (vinyl version) – 6:13
 "Emergency on Planet Earth" – 4:04
 "Space Cowboy" (radio edit) – 3:46
 "Light Years" (radio edit) – 3:59

 UK 12-inch vinyl 
 "Stillness in Time" (vinyl version) – 6:13
 "Space Cowboy" (classic radio edit) – 4:01
 "Space Cowboy" (classic club mix) – 7:52

Charts

References

1994 singles
1994 songs
1995 singles
Calvin Harris songs
Jamiroquai songs
Music Week number-one dance singles
Songs written by Jason Kay
Songs written by Toby Smith
S2 Records singles